Janov is a municipality and village in Svitavy District in the Pardubice Region of the Czech Republic. It has about 1,000 inhabitants.

Administrative parts
Hamlets of Gajer and Mendryka are administrative parts of Janov.

References

Villages in Svitavy District